Ernest Caffrey (born 1 October 1936) is a former Irish Fine Gael politician and publican. He was elected to Seanad Éireann on his third attempt, on the Industrial and Commercial Panel in 1997. He was elected to Mayo County Council and Ballina Urban District Council at the 1999 local elections. He lost his seat at the 2002 Seanad election. He was also an unsuccessful candidate at the 1989, 1992, 1997 and 2002 general elections.

References

1936 births
Living people
Fine Gael senators
Members of the 21st Seanad
Politicians from County Mayo
Local councillors in County Mayo
People from Ballina, County Mayo